Mislingford is a small area around the River Meon between the village of Swanmore and the small hamlet of Kingsmead on the A32 road in the City of Winchester district of Hampshire, England.

Villages in Hampshire